Tenorite is a copper oxide mineral with the chemical formula CuO.

Occurrence

Tenorite occurs in the weathered or oxidized zone associated with deeper primary copper sulfide orebodies. Tenorite commonly occurs with chrysocolla and the copper carbonates, azurite and malachite. The dull grey-black color of tenorite contrasts sharply with the often intergrown blue chrysocolla. Cuprite, native copper and Fe–Mn oxides also occur in this environment.

In addition to the hydrothermal, tenorite also occurs as a volcanic sublimate from Vesuvius, Campania, and Etna, Sicily, Italy. As a sublimate it occurs with copper chlorides, alkali chlorides and cotunnite. The Vesuvian sublimate occurrence was originally named melaconise or melaconite by F. S. Beudant in 1832. 

Tenorite was named in 1841 after the Italian botanist Michele Tenore (1780–1861).

See also
 Cuprite CuO
 List of minerals
 List of minerals named after people

References

Copper(II) minerals
Oxide minerals
Monoclinic minerals
Minerals in space group 15